The Luard Islands form an archipelago off the coast of Port Moresby, Papua New Guinea. They are in the region of Morobe and were named after Admiral (then Captain) Sir William Luard.

Archipelagoes of Papua New Guinea
Archipelagoes of the Pacific Ocean